The On Hing & Brothers Store is an historic building in Victoria, British Columbia, Canada.  It houses a Chinese restaurant and Chinese grocery shop. It has 4 floors in total including the roof, but 3 are only habitable. It was built in 1882, but the original one was demolished. However, it was rebuilt in 1914. , which is the current one.

See also
 List of historic places in Victoria, British Columbia

References

External links

 

1882 establishments in Canada
Buildings and structures in Victoria, British Columbia
Chinese-Canadian culture
Commercial buildings completed in 1882